The Styrian Prealps (in German Steirisches Randgebirge, in Slovenian Štajersko Robno hribovje, in Hungarian Stájer Elő-Alpok) is the proposed name for a subdivision of mountains in a new, and as yet unadopted, classification of the Alps, located in Austria and, marginally, in Slovenia and Hungary.

Geography 
The whole range is drained by the tributaries of the Danube river.

SOIUSA classification 
According to SOIUSA (International Standardized Mountain Subdivision of the Alps) the Styrian Prealps are an Alpine section, classified in the following way:
 main part = Eastern Alps
 major sector = Central Eastern Alps
 section = Styrian Prealps
 code = II/A-20

Subdivision 
The Styrian Prealps are divided into four subsections:
 North-western Styrian Prealps (Stubalpe; Gleinalpe; Western Graz Highlands) - SOIUSA code:II/A-20.I;
 South-western Styrian Prealps (Koralpe; Reinischkögel; Kobansko) - SOIUSA code:II/A-20.II
 Central Styrian Prealps (Fischbach Alps; Eastern Graz Highlands) - SOIUSA code:II/A-20.III;
 Eastern Styrian Prealps (Wechsel-Joglland; Bucklige Welt; Bernstein-Güns; Rosalien-Ödenburg) - SOIUSA code:II/A-20.IV.

Notable summits

Some notable summits of the Styrian Prealps are:

References

Mountain ranges of Slovenia
Mountain ranges of Hungary
Mountain ranges of the Alps
Mountain ranges of Styria